The Presidium of the Supreme Soviet of the Ukrainian Soviet Socialist Republic, referred to between 1991 and 1996 as the Presidium of the Verkhovna Rada of Ukraine was the permanent body of the Supreme Soviet of the Ukrainian SSR then of the Verkhovna Rada, accountable to the Supreme Soviet in its activity, and, within the nominal limits prescribed by the Constitution of the Ukrainian SSR, performed functions of the highest state power in the Ukrainian SSR. It was first established by the constitution in 1937 to replace the Central Executive Committee of Ukraine. Its membership was elected for the first time on December 27, 1938, at the first session of the Supreme Soviet of the Ukrainian SSR. The presidium later became the permanent body of the post-Soviet legislature of Ukraine, the Verkhovna Rada, but was dissolved upon the adaption of the Constitution of Ukraine on June 28, 1996.

Background
According to the Constitution of the Ukrainian SSR, the presidium was elected by the Supreme Soviet from among the people's deputies, at the first session of each following convocation for the entire term of the Supreme Soviet; however, when a new convocation of the Supreme Soviet was elected, the outgoing presidium retained its powers until a new presidium was elected. The presidium was competent to issue  and resolutions and possessed the right of legislative initiative in the Supreme Soviet, and was, in effect, the Ukrainian SSR's collective head of state. The constitution also required more detailed provisions regarding the legal status, competence, order of formation, and activity of the presidium to be defined by the standing orders of the Supreme Soviet.

After 1991, the powers of the presidium were narrowed. Some of the powers were delegated to the newly created post of the President of Ukraine, while others were transferred to the Verkhovna Rada. With the adoption of the post-Soviet constitution in 1996, the presidium was dissolved, though the term is still collectively applied to the chairman, deputy chairmen and occasionally also to the parliamentary faction leaders of the Verkhovna Rada.

Composition
The presidium was initially composed of a chairman, two vice chairmen, a secretary, and fifteen ordinary members. Following the adoption of the 1978 Constitution of the Ukrainian SSR, the number of vice chairmen was increased to three and the number of ordinary members became twenty.

Powers
At the adoption of the 1978 Constitution of the Ukrainian SSR, the presidium had the powers to:
 Call elections for the Supreme Soviet and local soviets and elections of district and city courts
 Convene sessions of the Supreme Soviet
 Coordinate the activities  of the Supreme Soviet's permanent commissions
 Exercise control over the activities of local councils (soviets)
 Monitor observance of the constitution
 Interpret republican laws
 Override decisions and regulations of the Council of Ministers of the Ukrainian SSR and of local soviets in case of their inconsistency with the law
 Resolve issues concerning the administrative-territorial system
 Establish and change borders of regions and their raions (districts)
 Establish and award honorary titles of the Ukrainian SSR, including an honorary diploma and a Diploma of the Presidium
 Grant citizenship of the Ukrainian SSR
 Solve issues concerning of granting asylum, including issuing acts of amnesty and granting pardons to citizens convicted by courts of the Ukrainian SSR
 Ratify and denounce international treaties of the Ukrainian SSR
 Appoint and recall diplomatic representatives of the Ukrainian SSR in foreign countries and international organizations
 Receive letters of credence and recall of diplomatic representatives of foreign countries accredited to it
 If necessary, between sessions of the Supreme Soviet, Amend the laws of the Ukrainian SSR, subject to subsequent approval by the Supreme Soviet
 Create and liquidate ministries and state committees on the proposal of the Council of Ministers of the Ukrainian SSR
 Appoint and dismiss ministers and state commissioners on the proposal of the Chairman of the Council of Ministers

List of chairmen

Chairmen of the Presidium (distinct office)
 July 27, 1938 - July 28, 1939 -- Leonid Korniets
 July 28, 1939 - January 15, 1954 -- Mykhailo Hrechukha
 January 15, 1954 - April 7, 1969 -- Demyan Korotchenko
 June 19, 1969 - June 9, 1972 -- Oleksandr Lyashko
 July 28, 1972 - June 24, 1976 -- Ivan Hrushetsky
 June 24, 1976 - November 22, 1984 -- Oleksiy Vatchenko
 March 27, 1985 - May 15, 1990 -- Valentyna Shevchenko
 June 4, 1990 - July 9, 1990 -- Volodymyr Ivashko
 July 23, 1990 - October 23, 1990 -- Leonid Kravchuk

Chairmen of the Presidium (ex officio as Chairman of the Verkhovna Rada)
 October 23, 1990 - December 5, 1991 -- Leonid Kravchuk
 December 5, 1991 - May 11, 1994 -- Ivan Plyushch
 May 11, 1994 - June 28, 1996 -- Oleksandr Moroz

See also
 Presidium of the Supreme Soviet
 Chairman of the Verkhovna Rada

Further reading
 Bezpalyi, I. Presidium of supreme councils of union republics. Moscow 1959
 Krivenko, L. Constitution of the USSR and development of legislation of supreme councils of union republics. Comparative legal research. Kiev 1982
 Bandurka, O., Dreval, Yu. Parliamentarism in Ukraine: establishment and development. Kharkiv 1999
 Ukrainian parliamentarism: past and present. Kiev 1999
 Kyslyi, P., Vaiz, Ch. Establishment of parliamentarism in Ukraine on the background of world experience. Kiev 2000

External links
 Presidium of the Verkhovna Rada. Ukrainian Soviet Encyclopedia.
 Presidium of the Verkhovna Rada. Jurist Encyclopedia (Ukraine).
 Presidium of Verkhovna Rada. Encyclopedia of History of Ukraine.

Supreme Soviet of the Ukrainian Soviet Socialist Republic
1938 establishments in Ukraine
1996 disestablishments in Ukraine